Newry R.F.C. (also known as Newry Rugby Club or Newry RFC) is an Irish amateur rugby union club, founded in 1925 and based Newry, Northern Ireland. The club is a member of the Irish Rugby Football Union Ulster Branch.  The club currently fields two senior teams, several junior teams ranging from Mini's (6 years old and up) to under-18. The Newry 1st XV currently participate in the Ulster Kukri Qualifying League Section 3 and the Gordon West Cup, while the 2nd XV participate in the Junior Leagues.

In Recent times, the club also has some strong links with the local GAA clubs and local schools, with the club picking up local GAA talent with cousins Dwayne Carlisle and Curtis McEvoy in the middle creating a devastating defence and ultimately integrating them into the senior set up. 

Each year Newry kicks off the season with a 10 a side tournament based in the beautiful surroundings of Kilbroney Park, Rostrever. This attracts teams from all over Ulster and further a field. It is a great opportunity to start off the season. This event has now relocated to Telford Park.

Grounds

The club's home ground is known as Telford Park. The team currently has two playing fields located at this ground along with the clubhouse.  The clubhouse contains the members' bar and function room.  The grounds are located on the outskirts of Newry on the main Newry to Hilltown road between Mackins Concrete and the Cove Bar.

Newry
Irish rugby union teams
Rugby union clubs in Northern Ireland
Rugby union clubs in County Down
1925 establishments in Northern Ireland